VGO may refer to:

 Vacuum gas oil, heavy oils left over from petroleum distillation that can be further refined in a catalytic cracking unit
 Vgo (stonemason)
 Vickers Gas Operated machine gun, a service name for the Vickers K machine gun
 Video Game Orchestra, a video game music arrangement group based in Boston
 Vigo-Peinador Airport (IATA: VGO), Province of Pontevedra, Spain
 VGo, a robotic telepresence device owned by Vecna Technologies
 A series of very large bomber aircraft produced by Gothaer Waggonfabrik; see Zeppelin-Staaken V.G.O.I
 New Gen Airways (ICAO: VGO), Bangkok, Thailand